Poymenny is a rural locality (a settlement) in Novorychinsky Selsoviet, Privolzhsky District, Astrakhan Oblast, Russia. The population was 1,299 as of 2010. There are 28 streets.

Geography 
Poymenny is located 22 km north of Nachalovo (the district's administrative centre) by road. Bely Ilmen is the nearest rural locality.

References 

Rural localities in Privolzhsky District, Astrakhan Oblast